Komarovsky (masculine), Komarovskaya (feminine), or Komarovskoye (neuter) is the name of several rural localities in Russia:
Komarovsky, Krasnoyarsk Krai, a settlement in Mokrushinsky Selsoviet of Kansky District of Krasnoyarsk Krai
Komarovsky, Orenburg Oblast, a settlement in Orenburg Oblast under the administrative jurisdiction of the closed administrative-territorial formation of the same name
Komarovskaya, a village in Verkhnetoyemsky Selsoviet of Verkhnetoyemsky District of Arkhangelsk Oblast